Stuart Veitch (born 22 April 1940) is a New Zealand cricketer. He played in seven first-class matches for Northern Districts from 1960 to 1967.

See also
 List of Northern Districts representative cricketers

References

External links
 

1940 births
Living people
New Zealand cricketers
Northern Districts cricketers
Cricketers from Gisborne, New Zealand